Benjamin Lee Arnold (died January 30, 1892) was an American academic and the second president of Oregon State University.

Benjamin Lee Arnold  grew up in Mecklenburg County, Virginia.  He received his B.S. from Randolph Macon College and taught in North Carolina, Tennessee, and Virginia. After graduating from Randolph-Macon College, he joined up with the Confederate States Army and served under General Robert E. Lee, he was discharged three years later because of a physical problem. After recovering, he started his career as a teacher.

Before coming to Oregon State University, he taught at several schools including West Tennessee College (now Union University) in Jackson and Virginia. In the summer of 1872, he was appointed as the president of Oregon State University by the bishops of the Methodist Episcopal Church, South, and came to Corvallis, Oregon in September of the same year. As a Confederate veteran, arrived at the college "prepared to take charge of neglected military tactics as soon as arms arrived," and is credited with starting  Oregon State University Army ROTC.  He served in that capacity until his death on January 30, 1892.

He died on January 30, 1892, during his incumbency as a president there.

References

External links
The Professors in Pickett's Charge

Oregon State University faculty
Presidents of Oregon State University
1892 deaths
People of Oregon in the American Civil War
Randolph–Macon College alumni
1839 births
Confederate States Army personnel
Southern Methodists
19th-century Methodists